Elijah Dart (12 March 1880 – 1954) was an English professional footballer who played as a wing half.

References

1880 births
1954 deaths
Footballers from Chesterfield
English footballers
Association football wing halves
Skinningrove F.C. players
Grimsby Town F.C. players
English Football League players